Peter Cipollone (born February 5, 1971) is an American rower who was the coxswain of the 2004 Olympic gold medal-winning U.S. men's eight rowing team.  He is a native of Ardmore, Pennsylvania, and attended Saint Joseph's Preparatory School in Philadelphia and the University of California, Berkeley.  Cipollone won World Championships. in the heavyweight men's eight in 1997, 1998, and 1999.

References

External links
 

1971 births
Living people
People from Ardmore, Pennsylvania
Sportspeople from Marietta, Ohio
Rowers at the 2000 Summer Olympics
Rowers at the 2004 Summer Olympics
Olympic gold medalists for the United States in rowing
St. Joseph's Preparatory School alumni
University of California, Berkeley alumni
Coxswains (rowing)
American male rowers
World Rowing Championships medalists for the United States
Medalists at the 2004 Summer Olympics
Pan American Games medalists in rowing
Pan American Games gold medalists for the United States
Pan American Games silver medalists for the United States
Rowers at the 1995 Pan American Games
21st-century American people